Mount Freedom Presbyterian Church is a historic Christian house of worship affiliated with the Presbyterian Church (U.S.A.) and located at the intersection of Sussex Turnpike and Church Road in the Mount Freedom section of Randolph Township in Morris County, New Jersey, United States.  This congregation is overseen by the Presbytery of Newton. This church was closed for a few years. It is now Faithfulness Church, a Chinese Protestant Church.

The church building was built in 1868 and added to the National Register of Historic Places in 1991.

References

External links

19th-century Presbyterian church buildings in the United States
Churches in Morris County, New Jersey
Churches on the National Register of Historic Places in New Jersey
Churches completed in 1868
Georgian architecture in New York (state)
Presbyterian churches in New Jersey
National Register of Historic Places in Morris County, New Jersey
Randolph, New Jersey